CSEB may refer to:

 Compressed stabilized earth block, a building material, see Compressed earth block
 Chhattisgarh State Electricity Board, a former Indian electricity generation company, now Chhattisgarh State Power Generation Company